In six-dimensional Euclidean geometry, the cyclotruncated 6-simplex honeycomb is a space-filling tessellation (or honeycomb). The tessellation fills space by 6-simplex, truncated 6-simplex, bitruncated 6-simplex, and tritruncated 6-simplex facets. These facet types occur in proportions of 2:2:2:1 respectively in the whole honeycomb.

Structure
It can be constructed by seven sets of parallel hyperplanes that divide space. The hyperplane intersections generate  cyclotruncated 5-simplex honeycomb divisions on each hyperplane.

Related polytopes and honeycombs

See also
Regular and uniform honeycombs in 6-space:
6-cubic honeycomb
6-demicubic honeycomb
6-simplex honeycomb
Omnitruncated 6-simplex honeycomb
222 honeycomb

Notes

References 
 Norman Johnson Uniform Polytopes, Manuscript (1991)
 Kaleidoscopes: Selected Writings of H.S.M. Coxeter, edited by F. Arthur Sherk, Peter McMullen, Anthony C. Thompson, Asia Ivic Weiss, Wiley-Interscience Publication, 1995,  
 (Paper 22) H.S.M. Coxeter, Regular and Semi Regular Polytopes I, [Math. Zeit. 46 (1940) 380-407, MR 2,10] (1.9 Uniform space-fillings)
 (Paper 24) H.S.M. Coxeter, Regular and Semi-Regular Polytopes III, [Math. Zeit. 200 (1988) 3-45]

Honeycombs (geometry)
7-polytopes